

Champion
On March 28, 1972, at home in Dauphin, the Kings rule the roost for the third time in four years, capturing their third Turnbull Memorial Trophy as MJHL Champs.

League notes
The Dauphin Kings established a MJHL record of 40 Wins in a season.

Regular season

All-Star game
On February 1, the MJHL All-Stars played Toronto Marlboros of the Ontario Hockey League at the Winnipeg Arena. The Marlies led by Steve Shutt's 2 goals edged the All-Stars 8-7. Other Marlies goals were scored by Dave Gardner, Billy Harris, George Ferguson, Dennis Maruk, Tom Thomson, and Kevin Devine. Replying for the All-Stars were Rick Blight with a pair, Don Larway, Steve Craft, Brad Carefoot, Murray Fadden, and Kim Murphy added singles.

MJHL Lineup:

Goal: Sandy Kuby (St. James); Rick St. Croix (Kenora)
Defence: Drew Trapp (Dauphin); Mike Korney (Dauphin); Steve Craft (St. Boniface); Perry Miller (West Kildonan); Manley Dubroy (Kenora); Greg Tallon (St. James)
Centre: Kim Murphy (Kenora); Jim Miller (Dauphin); Gary Hanson (St. James); Ed Tkachyk (Dauphin)   
 Leftwing: Lothar Jochimski (Kenora); Grant Farncombe (Portage Terriers); Dave Marin (Dauphin); Harry Bell (Portage)
Rightwing: Brad Carefoot (Dauphin); Don Larway (Dauphin); Murray Fadden (Kenora); Rick Blight (Portage)
Coaches: Laurie Langrell (St. James); Steve Hawrysh (Dauphin)

Playoffs
Division Semi-Finals
Dauphin defeated Selkirk 4-games-to-none
Portage defeated Kenora 4-games-to-1
St. James defeated Winnipeg 4-games-to-2
St. Boniface Saints lost to West Kildonan 4-games-to-1
Divisional Finals
Dauphin defeated Portage 4-games-to-none
St. James lost to West Kildonan 4-games-to-1
Turnbull Cup Championship
Dauphin defeated West Kildonan 4-games-to-none
Anavet Cup Championship
Dauphin Kings lost to Humboldt Broncos (SJHL) 4-games-to-2

Awards

All-Star Teams

References
Manitoba Junior Hockey League
Manitoba Hockey Hall of Fame
Hockey Hall of Fame
Winnipeg Free Press Archives
Brandon Sun Archives

MJHL
Manitoba Junior Hockey League seasons